Budacu may refer to one of two places in Bistriţa-Năsăud County, Romania:

Budacu de Jos, a commune
Budacu de Sus, a village in Dumitrița Commune